Manolis Arvanitis (born 3 March 2001) is a Greek professional footballer who plays as a centre-back for Super League 2 club AEK Athens B.

References

2001 births
Living people
Greek footballers
Super League Greece 2 players
AEK Athens F.C. players
Association football defenders
AEK Athens F.C. B players
Aris Limassol FC players
Greek expatriate sportspeople in Cyprus
Greek expatriate footballers
Expatriate footballers in Cyprus